Candelária is a municipality in the state of Rio Grande do Sul, Brazil.

Paleontology 
The Museum Aristides Carlos Rodrigues, in this city, has fossils.

See also

List of municipalities in Rio Grande do Sul

References

Municipalities in Rio Grande do Sul